Geva (lit. Hill) is a kibbutz in the Jezreel Valley in Israel

Geva may also refer to:

Geva Theatre Center, New York, USA
Geva Films, film studio, Israel

Given name
Geva Mentor, English netball player
Geva Alon, Israeli blues/folk/rock musician and singer-songwriter

Surname
Eli Geva,  Israeli brigade commander
Dorit Geva, American sociologist
Dudu Geva, Israeli cartoonist, illustrator, and comic book creator
Miki Geva, Israeli stand-up comedian and actor
Tamara Geva, Soviet and American actress
Tsibi Geva,  Israeli educator and music/art critic

See also